Jean-Claude Paye may refer to:

 Jean-Claude Paye (sociologist) (born 1952), Belgian sociologist
 Jean-Claude Paye (OECD) (born 1934), French civil servant, Secretary-General of the OECD